Peyntour is a surname. Notable people with the surname include:

John Peyntour (14th-15th centuries), English politician
Stephen Peyntour, MP for Sandwich (UK Parliament constituency)
Johannes Peyntour, MP for Lewes (UK Parliament constituency)